The Ferrari Challenge is a single-marque motorsport championship. The Ferrari Challenge North America features the Trofeo Pirelli and Coppa Shell class system. This championship was inaugurated in 1994. It is organized by Ferrari North America and sanctioned by the International Motor Sports Association (IMSA). The 2016 season consists of seven rounds in the USA and Canada.

Teams and drivers

Race calendar and results

Championship standings

All drivers get a bonus point for appearing on the entry list, then 20 points for a (class) win, 15 for second, 12 for third, 10 for fourth, 8 for fifth, 6 for sixth, 4 for seventh and 2 points for eighth. All remaining entrants get 1 point. There is a bonus point for pole and fastest lap in each race.

Trofeo Pirelli

Trofeo Pirelli Am

Coppa Shell

References

External links
 

Ferrari Challenge North America
Ferrari Challenge North America
Ferrari Challenge North America
North America 2016